The mummies of Venzone are a number of mummies found in Venzone, Italy, in the 1600s. They were mummified by natural processes, and, while such mummies exist elsewhere, the cause of the Venzone mummies' preservation in particular still remains a mystery.

In 1906, The Literary Digest translated portions of an article by F. Savorgnan de Brazza, which first appeared in the French publication Cosmos. His article had described the history and characteristic of these naturally-preserved bodies. The forms and features of their appearance, he describes, were entirely recognizable. The first discovered corpse had weighed a total of only 33 pounds, with the remainder of them weighing somewhere between 22 and 44 pounds.

In his own time, Mr. de Brazza referred to the existence of a number of hypotheses regarding the cause of mummification. The most reasonable, he believed, was to attribute it to a species of fungus, Hypha tombicina, whose spores were known to be prevalent in both the tombs and their wooden coffins. Even so, the theory still remained only a reasonable speculation.

When de Brazza’s article and this subsequent translation were published, there were clearly doubts that remained, with the process unable to actually be replicated, as well as the “conditions that assure its [the fungus’] life and reproduction”  still remaining unknown. Another precarious position, as the Literary Digest observes, was in knowing that the mummies would likely never increase in number. The practice of burying dead in churches was later banned, thereby preventing much further observation of the natural process.

Recent developments 

At the time of de Brazza’s writing, the number of mummies in Venzone was numbered at 42. Following an earthquake in the area in 1976, the number has since been reduced to only 15.  Their declining number, understandably, has made it rather difficult to study precisely what the conditions behind their mummification had truly been. As University of Minnesota professor Arthur C. Aufderheide recounts, while the community of Venzone may be “incredibly hospitable,” those with jurisdiction over the bodies have often refused even Aufderheide himself to collect samples for analysis. In turn, this means that only already-collected cultures can generally be used today in analyzing what conditions might have caused mummification.

While a number of novel theories have been offered as to the cause of their preservation, there is still no conclusive opinion. De Brazza was content with attributing it to the presence of a fungus called Hypha tombicina, denying that limestone – an entirely possible cause of the mummies’ characteristics - was ever present in the tombs.  On the contrary, Aufderheide asserts that the mummies were indeed originally present in a tomb that contained a native limestone floor. Such a setting, he affirms, would have been entirely suitable for bringing about the very conditions that are still seen in these mummies today. Curiously, Aufderheide’s own recent studies have also failed to detect the presence of anything like the Hypha fungus.

References 

Archaeology of death
Mummies